Krantz is a surname.

Geographical distribution
As of 2014, 59.1% of all known bearers of the surname Krantz were residents of the United States (frequency 1:40,458), 22.7% of Sweden (1:2,867), 4.2% of France (1:105,067), 3.9% of Germany (1:136,212), 1.7% of Canada (1:142,077), 1.4% of Israel (1:39,650) and 1.4% of South Africa (1:260,746).

In Sweden, the frequency of the surname was higher than national average (1:2,867) in the following regions:
 1. Gävleborg County (1:1,245)
 2. Jönköping County (1:1,269)
 3. Västra Götaland County (1:1,980)
 4. Kalmar County (1:2,038)
 5. Kronoberg County (1:2,175)
 6. Halland County (1:2,216)
 7. Uppsala County (1:2,776)

People
 Albert Krantz (1448-1517), German historian 
 Gordon Krantz, Canadian politician
 Grover Krantz (1931-2002), American Bigfoot researcher
 Jacob Krantz (1900-1977), American actor better known as Ricardo Cortez
 Judith Krantz (1928–2019), American author and journalist
 Kermit E Krantz, American physician and inventor
 Morgan Krantz, American actor and writer
 Steve Krantz (1923–2007), American film producer and writer
 Steven G. Krantz, American mathematician
 Tobias Krantz (born 1971), Swedish politician
 Wayne Krantz, American musician
 Landen Krantz, Professional Football Player
 Ross Krantz, (1933-2017), Sound Engineer and Projectionist
 Stefanie Krantz, (1972 - ) Ecologist and Climate Change Planner

See also 
 Kranz (surname)
 Cranz (disambiguation)

References

German-language surnames
Jewish surnames